Chorthippus acroleucus is a species of grasshopper found in Romania.

References

acroleucus
Fauna of Romania
Insects described in 1924
Taxonomy articles created by Polbot